The 1882 Michigan Wolverines football team represented the University of Michigan in the 1882 college football season. The team played no outside games. The captain of the 1882 team was William J. Olcott.

Players

Varsity letter winners
 Elmer Beach, quarterback, Atwood, Michigan
 Harry Bitner, rusher, Mt. Carroll, Illinois
 Hugh P. Borden, rusher, New Carlisle, Indiana
 Henry Brock, rusher, Holly, Michigan
 John Couch, rusher, Pittsburgh, Pennsylvania
 Richard G. DePuy, halfback, Jamestown, North Dakota
 Richard Millard Dott, halfback, Sioux City, Iowa
 Thomas H. Gilmore, goalkeeper, Chicago, Illinois
 William Harrison Mace, rusher
 William J. Olcott, three-quarter back, Ishpeming, Michigan
 Horace Prettyman, rusher, Bryan, Ohio

Others
 William J. Duff, Oswego, New York
 Robert Campbell Gemmel, Salt Lake City, Utah

References

External links
 1882 Football Team – Bentley Historical Library, University of Michigan Athletics History
 The Michigan Argonaut, 1882-1883
 The Chronicle, 1882-1883
 The Palladium, 1883

Michigan
Michigan Wolverines football seasons
College football undefeated seasons
College football winless seasons
Michigan Wolverines football